Jordy Josué Caicedo Medina (born 18 November 1997) is an Ecuadorian professional footballer who plays as a forward for Turkish club Sivasspor, on loan from Tigres UANL.

Club career
As a child, Caicedo played football "in rich boy" neighborhoods, bet money and always won. At the age of 15, he had an unsuccessful trial with Santos, one of the most successful teams in Brazil. He has been compared to Ecuador international Felipe Caicedo. In February 2021, he joined Bulgarian club CSKA Sofia. In July 2022, Caicedo relocated to Mexico, signing a contract with Tigres UANL.

International career
Caicedo made his senior national team debut on 4 June 2021 in a World Cup qualifying match against Brazil. He substituted Enner Valencia in the 76th minute.

Caicedo made his debut in a professional tournament later that month in the 2021 Copa América, coming on as a second half substitute in the opening match against Colombia. Caicedo scored his first goal for the senior national team on 25 March 2022, converting a penalty in another World Cup qualifying match against Paraguay in a 3-1 loss.

Career statistics

Club

International
Scores and results list Ecuador's goal tally first.

Honours
CSKA Sofia
 Bulgarian Cup: 2020–21

Individual
Best foreign player in Bulgarian football for 2021 (shared with Jurgen Mattheij)

References

Living people
1997 births
People from Machala
Ecuadorian footballers
Association football forwards
Ecuador international footballers
C.D. Universidad Católica del Ecuador footballers
C.D. El Nacional footballers
C.S. Norte América footballers
Esporte Clube Vitória players
PFC CSKA Sofia players
Tigres UANL footballers
Sivasspor footballers
Ecuadorian Serie A players
Campeonato Brasileiro Série B players
First Professional Football League (Bulgaria) players
Liga MX players
2021 Copa América players
Ecuadorian expatriate footballers
Expatriate footballers in Brazil
Ecuadorian expatriate sportspeople in Brazil
Expatriate footballers in Bulgaria
Ecuadorian expatriate sportspeople in Bulgaria
Expatriate footballers in Mexico
Ecuadorian expatriate sportspeople in Mexico
Expatriate footballers in Turkey
Ecuadorian expatriate sportspeople in Turkey